Californian fuchsia or California fuchsia may refer to one of two plant species:
 Epilobium canum, species of willowherb in the evening primrose family
 Ribes speciosum, species of flowering plant in the family Grossulariaceae